Carl Schulz was a Norwegian educator and politician.

Carl Schulz may also refer to:

Carl Theodor Schulz (1835–1914), Norwegian gardener
Carl Schulz (footballer) (1901–1971), German international footballer

See also
Carl Schultz (born 1939), Hungarian-Australian film director
Karl Schulze (disambiguation)
Schulz (surname)